Saudi Arabia, officially the Kingdom of Saudi Arabia (KSA), is a country in Western Asia. It is bordered by the Red Sea to the west; Jordan, Iraq, and Kuwait to the north; the Persian Gulf, Qatar and the United Arab Emirates to the east; Oman to the southeast; and Yemen to the south. Bahrain is an island country off its east coast. The Gulf of Aqaba in the northwest separates Saudi Arabia from Egypt and Israel. Saudi Arabia is the only country with a coastline along both the Red Sea and the Persian Gulf, and most of its terrain consists of arid desert, lowland, steppe, and mountains. Its capital and largest city is Riyadh. The country is home to Mecca and Medina, the two holiest cities in Islam.

Pre-Islamic Arabia, the territory that constitutes modern-day Saudi Arabia, was the site of several ancient cultures and civilizations; the prehistory of Saudi Arabia shows some of the earliest traces of human activity in the world. The world's second-largest religion, Islam, emerged in what is now Saudi Arabia. In the early 7th century, the Islamic prophet Muhammad united the population of the Arabian Peninsula and created a single Islamic religious polity. Following his death in 632, his followers rapidly expanded the territory under Muslim rule beyond Arabia, conquering huge and unprecedented swathes of territory (from the Iberian Peninsula in the west to parts of Central and South Asia in the east) in a matter of decades. Arab dynasties originating from modern-day Saudi Arabia founded the Rashidun (632–661), Umayyad (661–750), Abbasid (750–1517), and Fatimid (909–1171) caliphates, as well as numerous other dynasties in Asia, Africa, and Europe.

The area of modern-day Saudi Arabia formerly consisted of mainly four distinct historical regions: Hejaz, Najd, and parts of Eastern Arabia (Al-Ahsa) and South Arabia ('Asir). The Kingdom of Saudi Arabia was founded in 1932 by King Abdulaziz (known as Ibn Saud in the West). He united the four regions into a single state through a series of conquests beginning in 1902 with the capture of Riyadh, the ancestral home of his family, the House of Saud. Saudi Arabia has since been an absolute monarchy, where political decisions are made on the basis of consultation among the King, the Council of Ministers, and the country’s traditional elites that oversee a highly authoritarian regime. The ultraconservative Wahhabi religious movement within Sunni Islam has been described as a "predominant feature of Saudi culture", although some moves to curtail the religious establishment and push a heightened emphasis on national identity and history over religious one have been made by the government in recent years. In its Basic Law, Saudi Arabia continues to define itself as a sovereign Arab Islamic state with Islam as its official religion, Arabic as its official language, and Riyadh as its capital.

Petroleum was discovered in 1938 and followed up by several other finds in the Eastern Province. Saudi Arabia has since become the world's second-largest oil producer (behind the US) and the world's largest oil exporter, controlling the world's second-largest oil reserves and the fourth-largest gas reserves. The kingdom is categorized as a World Bank high-income economy and is the only Arab country to be part of the G20 major economies. The state has attracted criticism for a variety of reasons, including its role in the Yemeni Civil War, alleged sponsorship of Islamic terrorism and its poor human rights record, including the excessive and often extrajudicial use of capital punishment.

Saudi Arabia is considered both a regional and middle power. The Saudi economy is the largest in the Middle East; the world's eighteenth-largest economy by nominal GDP and the seventeenth-largest by PPP. As a country with a very high Human Development Index, it offers a tuition-free university education, no personal income tax, and a free universal health care system. Saudi Arabia is home to the world's third-largest immigrant population. It also has one of the world's youngest populations, with approximately 50 per cent of its population of 34.2 million being under 25 years old. In addition to being a member of the Gulf Cooperation Council, Saudi Arabia is an active and founding member of the United Nations, Organisation of Islamic Cooperation, Arab League, Arab Air Carriers Organization and OPEC.

Etymology 

Although this is normally translated as "the Kingdom of Saudi Arabia" in English, it literally means "the Saudi Arab kingdom", or "the Arab Saudi Kingdom".

The word "Saudi" is derived from the element as-Saʿūdīyah in the Arabic name of the country, which is a type of adjective known as a nisba, formed from the dynastic name of the Saudi royal family, the Al Saud. Its inclusion expresses the view that the country is the personal possession of the royal family. Al Saud is an Arabic name formed by adding the word Al, meaning "family of" or "House of",  to the personal name of an ancestor. In the case of Al Saud, this is Saud ibn Muhammad ibn Muqrin, the father of the dynasty's 18th-century founder, Muhammad bin Saud.

History

Prehistory 

There is evidence that human habitation in the Arabian Peninsula dates back to about 125,000 years ago. A 2011 study found that the first modern humans to spread east across Asia left Africa about 75,000 years ago across the Bab-el-Mandeb connecting the Horn of Africa and Arabia. The Arabian peninsula is regarded as a central figure in the understanding of hominin evolution and dispersals. Arabia underwent an extreme environmental fluctuation in the Quaternary that led to profound evolutionary and demographic changes. Arabia has a rich Lower Paleolithic record, and the quantity of Oldowan-like sites in the region indicate a significant role that Arabia had played in the early hominin colonization of Eurasia.

In the Neolithic period, prominent cultures such as Al-Magar, whose centre lay in modern-day southwestern Najd flourished. Al-Magar could be considered a "Neolithic Revolution" in human knowledge and handicraft skills. The culture is characterized as being one of the world's first to involve the widespread domestication of animals, particularly the horse, during the Neolithic period. Aside from horses, animals such as sheep, goats, dogs, in particular of the Saluki breed, ostriches, falcons and fish were discovered in the form of stone statues and rock engravings. Al-Magar statues were made from local stone, and it seems that the statues were fixed in a central building that might have had a significant role in the social and religious life of the inhabitants.

In November 2017, hunting scenes showing images of the most likely domesticated dogs, resembling the Canaan dog, wearing leashes were discovered in Shuwaymis, a hilly region of northwestern Saudi Arabia. These rock engravings date back more than 8,000 years, making them the earliest depictions of dogs in the world.

At the end of the 4th millennium BC, Arabia entered the Bronze Age after witnessing drastic transformations; metals were widely used, and the period was characterized by its 2 m high burials which were simultaneously followed by the existence of numerous temples, that included many free-standing sculptures originally painted with red colours.

In May 2021, archaeologists announced that a 350,000-year-old Acheulean site named An Nasim in the Hail region could be the oldest human habitation site in northern Saudi Arabia. The site was first discovered in 2015 using remote sensing and palaeohydrological modelling. It contains paleolake deposits related with Middle Pleistocene materials. 354 artefacts, hand axes and stone tools, flakes discovered by researchers provided information about tool-making traditions of the earliest living man inhabited South-West Asia. Besides, Paleolithic artefacts are similar to material remains uncovered at the Acheulean sites in the Nefud Desert.

Pre-Islamic 

The earliest sedentary culture in Saudi Arabia dates back to the Ubaid period, upon discovering various pottery sherds at Dosariyah. Initial analysis of the discovery concluded that the eastern province of Saudi Arabia was the homeland of the earliest settlers of Mesopotamia, and by extension, the likely origin of the Sumerians. However, experts such as Joan Oates had the opportunity to see the Ubaid period sherds in eastern Arabia and consequently conclude that the sherds date to the last two phases of the Ubaid period (period three and four), while a handful of examples could be classified roughly as either Ubaid 3 or Ubaid 2. Thus, the idea that colonists from Saudi Arabia had emigrated to southern Mesopotamia and founded the region's first sedentary culture was abandoned.

Climatic change and the onset of aridity may have brought about the end of this phase of settlement, as little archaeological evidence exists from the succeeding millennium. The settlement of the region picks up again in the period of Dilmun in the early 3rd millennium. Known records from Uruk refer to a place called Dilmun, associated on several occasions with copper, and in later periods it was a source of imported woods in southern Mesopotamia. A number of scholars have suggested that Dilmun originally designated the eastern province of Saudi Arabia, notably linked with the major Dilmunite settlements of Umm an-Nussi and Umm ar-Ramadh in the interior and Tarout on the coast. It is likely that Tarout Island was the main port and the capital of Dilmun. Mesopotamian inscribed clay tablets suggests that, in the early period of Dilmun, a form of hierarchical organized political structure existed. In 1966, an earthwork in Tarout exposed an ancient burial field that yielded a large, impressive statue dating to the Dilmunite period (mid 3rd millennium BC). The statue was locally made under the strong Mesopotamian influence on the artistic principle of Dilmun.

By 2200 BC, the centre of Dilmun shifted for unknown reasons from Tarout and the Saudi Arabian mainland to the island of Bahrain, and a highly developed settlement emerged there, where a laborious temple complex and thousands of burial mounds dating to this period were discovered.

By the late Bronze Age, a historically recorded people and land (Midian and the Midianites) in the north-western portion of Saudi Arabia are well-documented in the Bible. Centred in Tabouk, it stretched from Wadi Arabah in the north to the area of al-Wejh in the south. The capital of Midian was Qurayyah, it consists of a large fortified citadel encompassing 35 hectares and below it lies a walled settlement of 15 hectares. The city hosted as many as 10 to 12 thousand inhabitants. The Midianites were depicted in two major events in the Bible that recount Israel's two wars with Midian, somewhere in the early 11th century BC. Politically, the Midianites were described as having a decentralized structure headed by five kings (Evi, Rekem, Tsur, Hur, and Reba), the names appears to be toponyms of important Midianite settlements. It is common to view that Midian designated a confederation of tribes, the sedentary element settled in the Hijaz while its nomadic affiliates pastured, and sometimes pillaged as far away land as Palestine. The nomadic Midianites were one of the earliest exploiters of the domestication of camels that enabled them to navigate through the harsh terrains of the region.

At the end of the 7th century BC, an emerging kingdom appeared in the historical theatre of north-western Arabia. It started as a Sheikdom of Dedan, which developed into the Kingdom of Lihyan tribe. The earliest attestation of state regality, King of Lihyan, was in the mid-sixth century BC. The second stage of the kingdom saw the transformation of Dedan from a mere city-state of which only influence they exerted was inside their city walls, to a kingdom that encompasses much wider domain that marked the pinnacle of Lihyan civilization. The third state occurred during the early 3rd century BC with bursting economic activity between the south and north that made Lihyan acquire large influence suitable to its strategic position on the caravan road.

Lihyan was a powerful and highly organized ancient Arabian kingdom that played a vital cultural and economic role in the north-western region of the Arabian Peninsula. The Lihyanites ruled over a large domain from Yathrib in the south and parts of the Levant in the north. In antiquity, Gulf of Aqaba used to be called Gulf of Lihyan. A testimony to the extensive influence that Lihyan acquired.

The Lihyanites fell into the hands of the Nabataeans around 65 BC upon their seizure of Hegra then marching to Tayma, and to their capital Dedan in 9 BC. The Nabataeans ruled large portions of north Arabia until their domain was annexed by the Roman Empire, which renamed it Arabia Petraea, and remained under the rule of the Romans until 630.

Middle Ages and rise of Islam 

Shortly before the advent of Islam, apart from urban trading settlements (such as Mecca and Medina), much of what was to become Saudi Arabia was populated by nomadic pastoral tribal societies. The Islamic prophet Muhammad was born in Mecca in about 570 CE. In the early 7th century, Muhammad united the various tribes of the peninsula and created a single Islamic religious polity. Following his death in 632, his followers rapidly expanded the territory under Muslim rule beyond Arabia, conquering huge and unprecedented swathes of territory (from the Iberian Peninsula in the west to parts of Central and South Asia in the east) in a matter of decades. Arabia soon became a more politically peripheral region of the Muslim world as the focus shifted to the vast and newly conquered lands.

Arabs originating from modern-day Saudi Arabia, the Hejaz in particular, founded the Rashidun (632–661), Umayyad (661–750), Abbasid (750–1517), and the Fatimid (909–1171) caliphates. From the 10th century to the early 20th century, Mecca and Medina were under the control of a local Arab ruler known as the Sharif of Mecca, but at most times the Sharif owed allegiance to the ruler of one of the major Islamic empires based in Baghdad, Cairo or Istanbul. Most of the remainder of what became Saudi Arabia reverted to traditional tribal rule.

For much of the 10th century, the Isma'ili-Shi'ite Qarmatians were the most powerful force in the Persian Gulf. In 930, the Qarmatians pillaged Mecca, outraging the Muslim world, particularly with their theft of the Black Stone. In 1077–1078, an Arab Sheikh named Abdullah bin Ali Al Uyuni defeated the Qarmatians in Bahrain and al-Hasa with the help of the Great Seljuq Empire and founded the Uyunid dynasty. The Uyunid Emirate later underwent expansion with its territory stretching from Najd to the Syrian desert. They were overthrown by the Usfurids in 1253. Usfurid rule was weakened after Persian rulers of Hormuz captured Bahrain and Qatif in 1320. The vassals of Ormuz, the Shia Jarwanid dynasty came to rule eastern Arabia in the 14th century. The Jabrids took control of the region after overthrowing the Jarwanids in the 15th century and clashed with Hormuz for more than two decades over the region for its economic revenues, until finally agreeing to pay tribute in 1507. Al-Muntafiq tribe later took over the region and came under Ottoman suzerainty. The Bani Khalid tribe later revolted against them in the 17th century and took control. Their rule extended from Iraq to Oman at its height and they too came under Ottoman suzerainty.

Ottoman Hejaz 

In the 16th century, the Ottomans added the Red Sea and Persian Gulf coast (the Hejaz, Asir and Al-Ahsa) to the Empire and claimed suzerainty over the interior. One reason was to thwart Portuguese attempts to attack the Red Sea (hence the Hejaz) and the Indian Ocean. The Ottoman degree of control over these lands varied over the next four centuries with the fluctuating strength or weakness of the Empire's central authority. These changes contributed to later uncertainties, such as the dispute with Transjordan over the inclusion of the sanjak of Ma'an, including the cities of Ma'an and Aqaba.

Foundation of the Saud dynasty 

The emergence of what was to become the Saudi royal family, known as the Al Saud, began in Nejd in central Arabia in February 1727, when Muhammad bin Saud, founder of the dynasty, joined forces with the religious leader Muhammad ibn Abd al-Wahhab, founder of the Wahhabi movement, a strict puritanical form of Sunni Islam. This alliance formed in the 18th century provided the ideological impetus to Saudi expansion and remains the basis of Saudi Arabian dynastic rule today.

In 1727, the Emirate of Diriyah established in the area around Riyadh rapidly expanded and briefly controlled most of the present-day territory of Saudi Arabia, sacking Karbala in 1802, and capturing Mecca in 1803. In 1818, it was destroyed by the Ottoman viceroy of Egypt, Mohammed Ali Pasha. The much smaller Emirate of Nejd was established in 1824. Throughout the rest of the 19th century, the Al Saud contested control of the interior of what was to become Saudi Arabia with another Arabian ruling family, the Al Rashid, who ruled the Emirate of Jabal Shammar. By 1891, the Al Rashid were victorious and the Al Saud were driven into exile in Kuwait.

At the beginning of the 20th century, the Ottoman Empire continued to control or have a suzerainty over most of the peninsula. Subject to this suzerainty, Arabia was ruled by a patchwork of tribal rulers, with the Sharif of Mecca having pre-eminence and ruling the Hejaz. In 1902, Abdul Rahman's son, Abdul Aziz—later to be known as Ibn Saud—recaptured control of Riyadh bringing the Al Saud back to Nejd, creating the third "Saudi state". Ibn Saud gained the support of the Ikhwan, a tribal army inspired by Wahhabism and led by Faisal Al-Dawish, and which had grown quickly after its foundation in 1912. With the aid of the Ikhwan, Ibn Saud captured Al-Ahsa from the Ottomans in 1913.

In 1916, with the encouragement and support of Britain (which was fighting the Ottomans in World War I), the Sharif of Mecca, Hussein bin Ali, led a pan-Arab revolt against the Ottoman Empire to create a united Arab state. Although the Arab Revolt of 1916 to 1918 failed in its objective, the Allied victory in World War I resulted in the end of Ottoman suzerainty and control in Arabia and Hussein bin Ali became King of Hejaz.

Ibn Saud avoided involvement in the Arab Revolt, and instead continued his struggle with the Al Rashid. Following the latter's final defeat, he took the title Sultan of Nejd in 1921. With the help of the Ikhwan, the Kingdom of Hejaz was conquered in 1924–25, and on 10 January 1926, Ibn Saud declared himself King of Hejaz. For the next five years, he administered the two parts of his dual kingdom as separate units.

After the conquest of the Hejaz, the Ikhwan leadership's objective switched to expansion of the Wahhabist realm into the British protectorates of Transjordan, Iraq and Kuwait, and began raiding those territories. This met with Ibn Saud's opposition, as he recognized the danger of a direct conflict with the British. At the same time, the Ikhwan became disenchanted with Ibn Saud's domestic policies which appeared to favour modernization and the increase in the number of non-Muslim foreigners in the country. As a result, they turned against Ibn Saud and, after a two-year struggle, were defeated in 1929 at the Battle of Sabilla, where their leaders were massacred. On 23 September 1932, the two kingdoms of the Hejaz and Nejd were united as the Kingdom of Saudi Arabia, and that date is now a national holiday called Saudi National Day.

Post-unification 

The new kingdom was reliant on limited agriculture and pilgrimage revenues. In 1938, vast reserves of oil were discovered in the Al-Ahsa region along the coast of the Persian Gulf, and full-scale development of the oil fields began in 1941 under the US-controlled Aramco (Arabian American Oil Company). Oil provided Saudi Arabia with economic prosperity and substantial political leverage internationally.

Cultural life rapidly developed, primarily in the Hejaz, which was the centre for newspapers and radio. However, the large influx of foreign workers in Saudi Arabia in the oil industry increased the pre-existing propensity for xenophobia. At the same time, the government became increasingly wasteful and extravagant. By the 1950s this had led to large governmental deficits and excessive foreign borrowing.

In 1953, Saud of Saudi Arabia succeeded as the king of Saudi Arabia, on his father's death, until 1964 when he was deposed in favour of his half brother Faisal of Saudi Arabia, after an intense rivalry, fuelled by doubts in the royal family over Saud's competence. In 1972, Saudi Arabia gained a 20 per cent control in Aramco, thereby decreasing US control over Saudi oil.

In 1973, Saudi Arabia led an oil boycott against the Western countries that supported Israel in the Yom Kippur War against Egypt and Syria, leading to the quadrupling of oil prices. In 1975, Faisal was assassinated by his nephew, Prince Faisal bin Musaid and was succeeded by his half-brother King Khalid.

By 1976, Saudi Arabia had become the largest oil producer in the world. Khalid's reign saw economic and social development progress at an extremely rapid rate, transforming the infrastructure and educational system of the country; in foreign policy, close ties with the US were developed. In 1979, two events occurred which greatly concerned the government, and had a long-term influence on Saudi foreign and domestic policy. The first was the Iranian Islamic Revolution. It was feared that the country's Shi'ite minority in the Eastern Province (which is also the location of the oil fields) might rebel under the influence of their Iranian co-religionists. There were several anti-government uprisings in the region such as the 1979 Qatif Uprising.

The second event was the Grand Mosque Seizure in Mecca by Islamist extremists. The militants involved were in part angered by what they considered to be the corruption and un-Islamic nature of the Saudi government. The government regained control of the mosque after 10 days and those captured were executed. Part of the response of the royal family was to enforce the much stricter observance of traditional religious and social norms in the country (for example, the closure of cinemas) and to give the Ulema a greater role in government. Neither entirely succeeded as Islamism continued to grow in strength.

In 1980, Saudi Arabia bought out the American interests in Aramco. King Khalid died of a heart attack in June 1982. He was succeeded by his brother, King Fahd, who added the title "Custodian of the Two Holy Mosques" to his name in 1986 in response to considerable fundamentalist pressure to avoid the use of "majesty" in association with anything except God. Fahd continued to develop close relations with the United States and increased the purchase of American and British military equipment.

The vast wealth generated by oil revenues was beginning to have an even greater impact on Saudi society. It led to rapid technological (but not cultural) modernization, urbanization, mass public education, and the creation of new media. This and the presence of increasingly large numbers of foreign workers greatly affected traditional Saudi norms and values. Although there was a dramatic change in the social and economic life of the country, political power continued to be monopolized by the royal family leading to discontent among many Saudis who began to look for wider participation in government.

In the 1980s, Saudi Arabia spent $25 billion in support of Saddam Hussein in the Iran–Iraq War; however, Saudi Arabia condemned the Iraqi invasion of Kuwait in 1990 and asked the US to intervene. King Fahd allowed American and coalition troops to be stationed in Saudi Arabia. He invited the Kuwaiti government and many of its citizens to stay in Saudi Arabia, but expelled citizens of Yemen and Jordan because of their governments' support of Iraq. In 1991, Saudi Arabian forces were involved both in bombing raids on Iraq and in the land invasion that helped to liberate Kuwait.

Saudi Arabia's relations with the West began to cause growing concern among some of the ulema and students of Sharia law and was one of the issues that led to an increase in Islamist terrorism in Saudi Arabia, as well as Islamist terrorist attacks in Western countries by Saudi nationals. Osama bin Laden was a Saudi citizen (until stripped of his citizenship in 1994) and was responsible for the 1998 U.S. embassy bombings in East Africa and the 2000 USS Cole bombing near the port of Aden, Yemen. 15 of the 19 terrorists involved in September 11 attacks in New York City, Washington, D.C., and near Shanksville, Pennsylvania were Saudi nationals. Many Saudis who did not support the Islamist terrorists were nevertheless deeply unhappy with the government's policies.

Islamism was not the only source of hostility to the government. Although extremely wealthy by the 21st century, Saudi Arabia's economy was near stagnant. High taxes and a growth in unemployment have contributed to discontent and have been reflected in a rise in civil unrest, and discontent with the royal family. In response, a number of limited reforms were initiated by King Fahd. In March 1992, he introduced the "Basic Law", which emphasized the duties and responsibilities of a ruler. In December 1993, the Consultative Council was inaugurated. It is composed of a chairman and 60 members—all chosen by the King. The King's intent was to respond to dissent while making as few actual changes in the status quo as possible. Fahd made it clear that he did not have democracy in mind, saying: "A system based on elections is not consistent with our Islamic creed, which [approves of] government by consultation [shūrā]."

In 1995, Fahd suffered a debilitating stroke, and the Crown Prince, Abdullah, assumed the role of de facto regent, taking on the day-to-day running of the country; however, his authority was hindered by conflict with Fahd's full brothers (known, with Fahd, as the "Sudairi Seven"). From the 1990s, signs of discontent continued and included, in 2003 and 2004, a series of bombings and armed violence in Riyadh, Jeddah, Yanbu and Khobar. In February–April 2005, the first-ever nationwide municipal elections were held in Saudi Arabia. Women were not allowed to take part in the poll.

In 2005, King Fahd died and was succeeded by Abdullah, who continued the policy of minimum reform and clamping down on protests. The king introduced a number of economic reforms aimed at reducing the country's reliance on oil revenue: limited deregulation, encouragement of foreign investment, and privatization. In February 2009, Abdullah announced a series of governmental changes to the judiciary, armed forces, and various ministries to modernize these institutions including the replacement of senior appointees in the judiciary and the Mutaween (religious police) with more moderate individuals and the appointment of the country's first female deputy minister.

On 29 January 2011, hundreds of protesters gathered in the city of Jeddah in a rare display of criticism against the city's poor infrastructure after deadly floods swept through the city, killing 11 people. Police stopped the demonstration after about 15 minutes and arrested 30 to 50 people.

Since 2011, Saudi Arabia has been affected by its own Arab Spring protests. In response, King Abdullah announced on 22 February 2011 a series of benefits for citizens amounting to $36 billion, of which $10.7 billion was earmarked for housing. No political reforms were announced as part of the package, though some prisoners indicted for financial crimes were pardoned. On 18 March the same year, King Abdullah announced a package of $93 billion, which included 500,000 new homes to a cost of $67 billion, in addition to creating 60,000 new security jobs. Although male-only municipal elections were held on 29 September 2011, Abdullah allowed women to vote and be elected in the 2015 municipal elections, and also to be nominated to the Shura Council.

Since 2001, Saudi Arabia has engaged in widespread internet censorship. Most online censorship generally falls into two categories: one based on censoring "immoral" (mostly pornographic and LGBT-supportive websites along with websites promoting any religious ideology other than Sunni Islam) and one based on a blacklist run by Saudi Arabia's Ministry of Media, which primarily censors websites critical of the Saudi regime or associated with parties that are opposed to or opposed by Saudi Arabia.

Politics 

Saudi Arabia is an absolute monarchy; however, according to the Basic Law of Saudi Arabia adopted by royal decree in 1992, the king must comply with Sharia (Islamic law) and the Quran, while the Quran and the Sunnah (the traditions of Muhammad) are declared to be the country's constitution. No political parties or national elections are permitted. Saudi Arabia is authoritarian, and some critics regard it as a totalitarian state. The Economist rated the Saudi government as the fifth most authoritarian government out of 167 rated in its 2012 Democracy Index, and Freedom House gave it its lowest "Not Free" rating, 7.0 ("1=best, 7=worst") for 2019.

In the absence of national elections and political parties, politics in Saudi Arabia takes place in two distinct arenas: within the royal family, the Al Saud, and between the royal family and the rest of Saudi society. Outside of the Al-Saud, participation in the political process is limited to a relatively small segment of the population and takes the form of the royal family consulting with the ulema, tribal sheikhs, and members of important commercial families on major decisions. This process is not reported by the Saudi media.

By custom, all males of full age have a right to petition the king directly through the traditional tribal meeting known as the majlis. In many ways the approach to government differs little from the traditional system of tribal rule. Tribal identity remains strong and, outside of the royal family, political influence is frequently determined by tribal affiliation, with tribal sheikhs maintaining a considerable degree of influence over local and national events. As mentioned earlier, in recent years there have been limited steps to widen political participation such as the establishment of the Consultative Council in the early 1990s and the National Dialogue Forum in 2003.

The rule of the Al Saud faces political opposition from four sources: Sunni Islamist activism; liberal critics; the Shi'ite minority—particularly in the Eastern Province; and long-standing tribal and regionalist particularistic opponents (for example in the Hejaz). Of these, the minority activists have been the most prominent threat to the government and have in recent years perpetrated a number of violent incidents in the country. However, open protest against the government, even if peaceful, is not tolerated.

Monarchy and royal family 

The king combines legislative, executive, and judicial functions and royal decrees form the basis of the country's legislation. The king is also the prime minister, and presides over the Council of Ministers of Saudi Arabia and Consultative Assembly of Saudi Arabia. The royal family dominates the political system. The family's vast numbers allow it to control most of the kingdom's important posts and to have an involvement and presence at all levels of government. The number of princes is estimated to be at least 7,000, with most power and influence being wielded by the 200 or so male descendants of Ibn Saud. The key ministries are generally reserved for the royal family, as are the 13 regional governorships.

Long-term political and government appointments have resulted in the creation of "power fiefdoms" for senior princes, such as those of King Abdullah, who had been Commander of the National Guard since 1963 (until 2010, when he appointed his son to replace him), former Crown Prince Sultan, Minister of Defence and Aviation from 1962 to his death in 2011, former crown prince Prince Nayef who was the Minister of Interior from 1975 to his death in 2012, Prince Saud who had been Minister of Foreign Affairs since 1975 and current King Salman, who was Minister of Defense and Aviation before he was crown prince and Governor of the Riyadh Province from 1962 to 2011. The current Minister of Defense is Prince Mohammad bin Salman, the son of King Salman and Crown Prince.

The royal family is politically divided by factions based on clan loyalties, personal ambitions and ideological differences. The most powerful clan faction is known as the 'Sudairi Seven', comprising the late King Fahd and his full brothers and their descendants. Ideological divisions include issues over the speed and direction of reform, and whether the role of the ulema should be increased or reduced. There were divisions within the family over who should succeed to the throne after the accession or earlier death of Prince Sultan. When prince Sultan died before ascending to the throne on 21 October 2011, King Abdullah appointed Prince Nayef as crown prince. The following year, Prince Nayef also died before ascending to the throne.

The Saudi government and the royal family have often been accused of corruption over many years, and this continues into the 21st century. In a country that is said to "belong" to the royal family and is named for them, the lines between state assets and the personal wealth of senior princes are blurred. The extent of corruption has been described as systemic and endemic, and its existence was acknowledged and defended by Prince Bandar bin Sultan (a senior member of the royal family) in an interview in 2001. Although corruption allegations have often been limited to broad undocumented accusations, specific allegations were made in 2007, when it was claimed that the British defence contractor BAE Systems had paid Prince Bandar US$2 billion in bribes relating to the Al-Yamamah arms deal. Prince Bandar denied the allegations. In 2010, investigations by both US and UK authorities resulted in plea bargain agreements with the company, by which it paid $447 million in fines but did not admit to bribery.

In its Corruption Perceptions Index for 2010, Transparency International gave Saudi Arabia a score of 4.7 (on a scale from 0 to 10 where 0 is "highly corrupt" and 10 is "highly clean"). Saudi Arabia has undergone a process of political and social reform, such as to increase public transparency and good governance, but nepotism and patronage are widespread when doing business in the country; the enforcement of the anti-corruption laws is selective and public officials engage in corruption with impunity. A number of prominent Saudi Arabian princes, government ministers, and businesspeople, including Prince Al-Waleed bin Talal, were arrested in Saudi Arabia in November 2017.

There has been mounting pressure to reform and modernize the royal family's rule, an agenda championed by King Abdullah both before and after his accession in 2005. The creation of the Consultative Council in the early 1990s did not satisfy demands for political participation, and, in 2003, an annual National Dialogue Forum was announced that would allow selected professionals and intellectuals to publicly debate current national issues, within certain prescribed parameters. In 2005, the first municipal elections were held. In 2007, the Allegiance Council was created to regulate the succession. In 2009, the king made significant personnel changes to the government by appointing reformers to key positions and the first woman to a ministerial post; however, these changes have been criticized as being too slow or merely cosmetic.

Al ash-Sheikh and role of the ulema 

Saudi Arabia is almost unique in giving the ulema (the body of Islamic religious leaders and jurists) a direct role in government. The preferred ulema are of the Salafi persuasion. The ulema have also been a key influence in major government decisions, for example the imposition of the oil embargo in 1973 and the invitation to foreign troops to Saudi Arabia in 1990. In addition, they have had a major role in the judicial and education systems and a monopoly of authority in the sphere of religious and social morals.

By the 1970s, as a result of oil wealth and the modernization of the country initiated by King Faisal, important changes to Saudi society were underway and the power of the ulema was in decline. However, this changed following the seizure of the Grand Mosque in Mecca in 1979 by Islamist radicals. The government's response to the crisis included strengthening the ulema's powers and increasing their financial support: in particular, they were given greater control over the education system and allowed to enforce the stricter observance of Wahhabi rules of moral and social behaviour. After his accession to the throne in 2005, King Abdullah took steps to reduce the powers of the ulema, for instance transferring control over girls' education to the Ministry of Education.

The ulema have historically been led by the Al ash-Sheikh, the country's leading religious family. The Al ash-Sheikh are the descendants of Muhammad ibn Abd al-Wahhab, the 18th-century founder of the Wahhabi form of Sunni Islam which is today dominant in Saudi Arabia. The family is second in prestige only to the Al Saud (the royal family) with whom they formed a "mutual support pact" and power-sharing arrangement nearly 300 years ago. The pact, which persists to this day, is based on the Al Saud maintaining the Al ash-Sheikh's authority in religious matters and upholding and propagating Wahhabi doctrine. In return, the Al ash-Sheikh support the Al Saud's political authority thereby using its religious-moral authority to legitimize the royal family's rule. Although the Al ash-Sheikh's domination of the ulema has diminished in recent decades, they still hold the most important religious posts and are closely linked to the Al Saud by a high degree of intermarriage.

Legal system 

The primary source of law is the Islamic Sharia derived from the teachings of the Qur'an and the Sunnah (the traditions of the Prophet). Saudi Arabia is unique among modern Muslim states in that Sharia is not codified and there is no system of judicial precedent, giving judges the power to use independent legal reasoning to make a decision. Because the judge is empowered to disregard previous judgments (either his own or of other judges) and may apply his personal interpretation of Sharia to any particular case, divergent judgments arise even in apparently identical cases, making predictability of legal interpretation difficult. Saudi judges tend to follow the principles of the Hanbali school of jurisprudence (fiqh) found in pre-modern texts and noted for its literalist interpretation of the Qur'an and hadith. However, in 2021, Saudi Arabia has announced new judicial reforms which will lead to an entirely codified law that eliminates discrepancies.

Royal decrees are the other main source of law; but are referred to as regulations rather than laws because they are subordinate to the Sharia. Royal decrees supplement Sharia in areas such as labour, commercial and corporate law. Additionally, traditional tribal law and custom remain significant. Extra-Sharia government tribunals usually handle disputes relating to specific royal decrees. Final appeal from both Sharia courts and government tribunals is to the King and all courts and tribunals follow Sharia rules of evidence and procedure.

Retaliatory punishments, or Qisas, are practised: for instance, an eye can be surgically removed at the insistence of a victim who lost his own eye. Families of someone unlawfully killed can choose between demanding the death penalty or granting clemency in return for a payment of diyya (blood money), by the perpetrator.

Foreign relations 

Saudi Arabia joined the UN in 1945 and is a founding member of the Arab League, Gulf Cooperation Council, Muslim World League, and the Organisation of the Islamic Conference (now the Organisation of Islamic Cooperation). It plays a prominent role in the International Monetary Fund and the World Bank, and in 2005 joined the World Trade Organization. Saudi Arabia supports the intended formation of the Arab Customs Union in 2015 and an Arab common market by 2020, as announced at the 2009 Arab League summit.

Since 1960, as a founding member of OPEC, its oil pricing policy has been generally to stabilize the world oil market and try to moderate sharp price movements so as to not jeopardize the Western economies. In 1973, Saudi Arabia and other Arab nations imposed an oil embargo against the United States, United Kingdom, Japan and other Western nations which supported Israel in the Yom Kippur War of October 1973. The embargo caused an oil crisis with many short- and long-term effects on global politics and the global economy.

Between the mid-1970s and 2002, Saudi Arabia expended over $70 billion in "overseas development aid". However, there is evidence that the vast majority was, in fact, spent on propagating and extending the influence of Wahhabism at the expense of other forms of Islam. There has been an intense debate over whether Saudi aid and Wahhabism has fomented extremism in recipient countries. The two main allegations are that, by its nature, Wahhabism encourages intolerance and promotes terrorism. Counting only the non-Muslim-majority countries, Saudi Arabia has paid for the construction of 1359 mosques, 210 Islamic centres, 202 colleges, and 2000 schools.

Saudi Arabia and the United States are strategic allies, and since President Barack Obama took office in 2009, the US has sold $110 billion in arms to Saudi Arabia. However, the relationship between Saudi Arabia and the United States became strained and have witnessed major decline during the last years of the Obama administration, although Obama had authorized US forces to provide logistical and intelligence support to the Saudis in their military intervention in Yemen, establishing a joint coordination planning cell with the Saudi military that is helping manage the war, and CIA used Saudi bases for drone assassinations in Yemen. In the first decade of the 21st century the Saudi Arabia paid approximately $100 million to American firms to lobby the U.S. government. On 20 May 2017, President Donald Trump and King Salman signed a series of letters of intent for Saudi Arabia to purchase arms from the United States totalling US$110 billion immediately and $350 billion over 10 years. In December 2021, the US Senate voted against a proposal to stop a $650 million sales of advanced medium range air-to-air missiles to Saudi Arabia to discourage it from its military intervention in Yemen.

In the Arab and Muslim worlds, Saudi Arabia is considered to be pro-Western and pro-American, and it is certainly a long-term ally of the United States. However, this and Saudi Arabia's role in the 1991 Gulf War, particularly the stationing of US troops on Saudi soil from 1991, prompted the development of a hostile Islamist response internally. As a result, Saudi Arabia has, to some extent, distanced itself from the US and, for example, refused to support or to participate in the US-led invasion of Iraq in 2003.

China and Saudi Arabia are major allies, with relationship between the two countries growing significantly in recent decades. A significant number of Saudi Arabians have also expressed a positive view of China. In February 2019, Crown Prince Mohammad defended China's Xinjiang re-education camps for Uyghur Muslims, saying "China has the right to carry out anti-terrorism and de-extremisation work for its national security." In July 2019, UN ambassadors of 37 countries, including Saudi Arabia, have signed a joint letter to the UNHRC defending China's treatment of Uyghurs and other Muslim minority groups in the Xinjiang region.

The consequences of the 2003 invasion and the Arab Spring led to increasing alarm within the Saudi monarchy over the rise of Iran's influence in the region. These fears were reflected in comments of King Abdullah, who privately urged the United States to attack Iran and "cut off the head of the snake". The tentative rapprochement between the US and Iran that began in secret in 2011 was said to be feared by the Saudis, and, during the run up to the widely welcomed deal on Iran's nuclear programme that capped the first stage of US–Iranian détente, Robert Jordan, who was US ambassador to Riyadh from 2001 to 2003, said "[t]he Saudis' worst nightmare would be the [Obama] administration striking a grand bargain with Iran." A trip to Saudi by US President Barack Obama in 2014 included discussions of US–Iran relations, though these failed to resolve Riyadh's concerns.

In order to protect the house of Khalifa, the monarchs of Bahrain, Saudi Arabia invaded Bahrain by sending military troops to quell the uprising of Bahraini people on 14 March 2011. The Saudi government considered the two-month uprising as a "security threat" posed by the Shia who represent the majority of Bahrain population.

On 25 March 2015, Saudi Arabia, spearheading a coalition of Sunni Muslim states, started a military intervention in Yemen against the Shia Houthis and forces loyal to former President Ali Abdullah Saleh, who was deposed in the 2011 Arab Spring uprisings. At least 56,000 people have been killed in armed violence in Yemen between January 2016 and October 2018.

Saudi Arabia, together with Qatar and Turkey, openly supported the Army of Conquest, an umbrella group of anti-government forces fighting in the Syrian Civil War that reportedly included an al-Qaeda linked al-Nusra Front and another Salafi coalition known as Ahrar al-Sham. Saudi Arabia was also involved in the CIA-led Timber Sycamore covert operation to train and arm Syrian rebels.

Following a number of incidents during the Hajj season, the deadliest of which killed at least 2,070 pilgrim in 2015 Mina stampede, Saudi Arabia has been accused of mismanagement and focusing on increasing money revenues while neglecting pilgrims' welfare.

In March 2015, Sweden scrapped an arms deal with Saudi Arabia, marking an end to a decade-old defence agreement with the kingdom. The decision came after Swedish Foreign Minister Margot Wallstrom was blocked by the Saudis while speaking about democracy and women's rights at the Arab League in Cairo. This also led to Saudi Arabia recalling its ambassador to Sweden.

Saudi Arabia has been seen as a moderating influence in the Arab–Israeli conflict, periodically putting forward a peace plan between Israel and the Palestinians and condemning Hezbollah. Following the Arab Spring Saudi Arabia offered asylum to deposed President Zine El Abidine Ben Ali of Tunisia and King Abdullah telephoned President Hosni Mubarak of Egypt (prior to his deposition) to offer his support. In early 2014 relations with Qatar became strained over its support for the Muslim Brotherhood, and Saudi Arabia's belief that Qatar was interfering in its affairs. In August 2014 both countries appeared to be exploring ways of ending the rift. Saudi Arabia and its allies have criticized Qatar-based TV channel Al Jazeera and Qatar's relations with Iran. In 2017, Saudi Arabia imposed a land, naval and air blockade on Qatar.

Saudi Arabia halted new trade and investment dealings with Canada and suspended diplomatic ties in a dramatic escalation of a dispute over the kingdom's arrest of women's rights activist Samar Badawi on 6 August 2018.

Tensions have escalated between Saudi Arabia and its allies after the assassination of Jamal Khashoggi at the Saudi consulate in Istanbul. This has strained the already problematic Saudi Arabia–Turkey relations. As stated by Ozgur Unluhisarcikli, director of the German Marshall Fund's Ankara office "Turkey is maintaining a very delicate balance in its relations with Saudi Arabia. The relations have the potential of evolving into a crisis at any moment."

The pressure on Saudi Arabia to reveal the truth about the assassination of Jamal Khashoggi from the US and European countries has increased. Saudi-US relations took an ugly turn on 14 October 2018, when Trump promised "severe punishment" if the royal court was responsible for Khashoggis' death. The Saudi Ministry of Foreign Affairs retaliated with an equal statement saying, "it will respond with greater action," indicating the kingdom's "influential and vital role in the global economy." A joint statement was issued by the UK, France, and Germany also demanding a "credible investigation to establish the truth about what happened, and — if relevant — to identify those bearing responsibility for the disappearance of Jamal Khashoggi, and ensure that they are held to account."

The US expects its Gulf allies involved in the coalition in Yemen to put in more efforts and address the rising concerns about the millions that have been pushed to the brink of famine. According to the United Nations, the Arabian peninsula nation is home to the world's worst humanitarian crisis. More than 50,000 children in Yemen died from starvation in 2017. The famine in Yemen is the direct result of the Saudi-led intervention and blockade of the rebel-held area.

In the wake of Jamal Khashoggi's murder in October 2018, the US secretary of state Mike Pompeo and the US defence secretary Jim Mattis called for a ceasefire in Yemen within 30 days followed by UN-initiated peace talks. Pompeo has asked Saudi Arabia and the UAE to stop their airstrikes on populated areas in Yemen. Theresa May backed the US call to end the coalition. President of the International Rescue Committee David Miliband called the US announcement as "the most significant breakthrough in the war in Yemen for four years".

In September 2020, Showtime announced that it will premiere its original documentary, Kingdom of Silence, on 2 October that year. The film was based on the 2018 murder of Jamal Khashoggi by Saudi authorities. Directed by filmmaker Rick Rowley, the documentary examines the relationship between the US and Saudi Arabia, as a backdrop to the murder of Khashoggi, along with the interactions between the Trump administration and Saudi Crown Prince Mohammed bin Salman. Another documentary by Bryan Fogel, The Dissident, which excavated a web of deceit behind the murder, was to be released on the same day that marked the second death anniversary of Khashoggi.

Jeremy Hunt, the UK Foreign Secretary, on his visit to Saudi Arabia and the UAE on 12 November 2018, is expected to raise the need for a ceasefire from all sides in the four-year-long Yemen civil war. The US called for a ceasefire within 30 days. Andrew Smith, of Campaign Against Arms Trade (CAAT), said that Hunt and Boris Johnson "played an utterly central and complicit role in arming and supporting the Saudi-led destruction of Yemen."

In 2017, as part of its nuclear power program, Saudi Arabia planned to extract uranium domestically, taking a step towards self-sufficiency in producing nuclear fuel. On 24 August 2017, the kingdom signed a memorandum of understanding with China National Nuclear Corporation (CNNC) to explore and assess uranium On 4 August 2020, a report claimed that Saudi Arabia has constructed a facility in the desert near Al-'Ula for extracting uranium yellowcake from uranium ore with the help of China. The facility raised concerns among the US and allied officials about Saudi nuclear energy plans and the country's option of developing nuclear weapon. On 19 August 2020, Congressional Democrats asked the US secretary of state, Mike Pompeo, to provide information about China's alleged role in building a uranium processing facility in Saudi Arabia.

On 17 September 2020, The Guardian released an exclusive report revealing that Saudi Arabia was paving the way for domestic production of nuclear fuel. The confidential report obtained by the media house stated that the kingdom was assisted by Chinese geologists to produce over 90,000 tonnes of uranium from three major deposits in the centre and northwest of Saudi, near the NEOM megacity development. The disclosure raised concerns regarding Riyadh's aggressive interest in developing atomic weapons program. Apart from China, the UN nuclear watchdog, International Atomic Energy Agency (IAEA) was also assisting Saudi's nuclear ambition.

Allegations of sponsoring global terrorism

According to the Iraqi prime minister Nouri al-Maliki in March 2014, Saudi Arabia along with Qatar provided political, financial, and media support to terrorists against the Iraqi government. Similarly, President of Syria Bashar al-Assad noted that the sources of the extreme ideology of the terrorist organization ISIS and other such salafist extremist groups are the Wahabbism that has been supported by the royal family of Saudi Arabia.

Relations with the U.S. became strained following 9/11 terror attacks. American politicians and media accused the Saudi government of supporting terrorism and tolerating a jihadist culture. Indeed, Osama bin Laden and 15 out of the 19 9/11 hijackers were from Saudi Arabia; in ISIL-occupied Raqqa, in mid-2014, all 12 judges were Saudi. The leaked US Department of State memo, dated 17 August 2014, says that "governments of Qatar and Saudi Arabia...are providing clandestine financial and logistic support to ISIS and other radical groups in the region." According to former US Secretary of State Hillary Clinton, "Saudi Arabia remains a critical financial support base for al-Qaida, the Taliban, LeT and other terrorist groups... Donors in Saudi Arabia constitute the most significant source of funding to Sunni terrorist groups worldwide." Former CIA director James Woolsey described it as "the soil in which Al-Qaeda and its sister terrorist organizations are flourishing." The Saudi government denies these claims or that it exports religious or cultural extremism. In April 2016, Saudi Arabia has threatened to sell off $750 billion in Treasury securities and other US assets if Congress passes a bill that would allow the Saudi government to be sued over 9/11. In September 2016, the Congress passed the Justice Against Sponsors of Terrorism Act that would allow relatives of victims of the 11 September attacks to sue Saudi Arabia for its government's alleged role in the attacks. Congress overwhelmingly rejected President Barack Obama's veto.

According to Sir William Patey, former British ambassador to Saudi Arabia, the kingdom funds mosques throughout Europe that have become hotbeds of extremism. "They are not funding terrorism. They are funding something else, which may down the road lead to individuals being radicalised and becoming fodder for terrorism," Patey said. He said that Saudi has been funding an ideology that leads to extremism and the leaders of the kingdom are not aware of the consequences.

However, since 2016 the kingdom began backing away from Islamist ideologies. Several reforms took place including curbing the powers of religious police, restricting the volume of loudspeakers in mosques, reducing the number of hours spent on Islamic education in schools, stopping funding mosques in foreign countries, and first mixed-gender concert performed by woman. In 2017, Saudi Crown Prince Mohammed bin Salman declared a return to "moderate Islam".

Military 

The Saudi Arabian Military Forces consists of the Royal Saudi Land Forces, the Royal Saudi Air Force, the Royal Saudi Navy, the Royal Saudi Air Defense, the Royal Saudi Strategic Missile Force, the Saudi Arabian National Guard, the Saudi Arabian Royal Guard, the Saudi Arabian Border Guard, the Saudi Arabian Emergency Force, the Special Security Forces, and the Special Security Unit, totalling nearly 480,700 active-duty personnel. In addition, there is the General Intelligence Presidency, Saudi Arabia's primary intelligence agency.

The kingdom has a long-standing military relationship with Pakistan, it has long been speculated that Saudi Arabia secretly funded Pakistan's atomic bomb programme and seeks to purchase atomic weapons from Pakistan, in near future. The SANG is not a reserve but a fully operational front-line force, and originated out of Ibn Saud's tribal military-religious force, the Ikhwan. Its modern existence, however, is attributable to it being effectively Abdullah's private army since the 1960s and, unlike the rest of the armed forces, is independent of the Ministry of Defense and Aviation. The SANG has been a counterbalance to the Sudairi faction in the royal family: The late prince Sultan, former Minister of Defense and Aviation, was one of the so-called 'Sudairi Seven' and controlled the remainder of the armed forces until his death in 2011.

Saudi Arabia has one of the highest percentages of military expenditure in the world, spending around 8% of its GDP in its military, according to the 2020 SIPRI estimate, which places it as the world's third biggest military spender behind the United States and China, and the world's largest arms importer from 2015 to 2019, receiving half of all the US arms exports to the Middle East. Spending on defence and security has increased significantly since the mid-1990s and was about US$78.4 billion, as of 2019. 

According to the BICC, Saudi Arabia is the 28th most militarized country in the world and possesses the second-best military equipment qualitatively in the region, after Israel. Its modern high-technology arsenal makes Saudi Arabia among the world's most densely armed nations, with its military equipment being supplied primarily by the US, France, and Britain.

The United States sold more than $80 billion in military hardware between 1951 and 2006 to the Saudi military. On 20 October 2010, the US State Department notified Congress of its intention to make the biggest arms sale in American history—an estimated $60.5 billion purchase by the Kingdom of Saudi Arabia. The package represents a considerable improvement in the offensive capability of the Saudi armed forces. 2013 saw Saudi military spending climb to $67bn, overtaking that of the UK, France and Japan to place fourth globally.

The United Kingdom has also been a major supplier of military equipment to Saudi Arabia since 1965. Since 1985, the UK has supplied military aircraft—notably the Tornado and Eurofighter Typhoon combat aircraft—and other equipment as part of the long-term Al-Yamamah arms deal estimated to have been worth £43 billion by 2006 and thought to be worth a further £40 billion. In May 2012, British defence giant BAE signed a £1.9bn ($3bn) deal to supply Hawk trainer jets to Saudi Arabia.

According to the Stockholm International Peace Research Institute, SIPRI, in 2010–14 Saudi Arabia became the world's second-largest arms importer, receiving four times more major arms than in 2005–2009. Major imports in 2010–14 included 45 combat aircraft from the UK, 38 combat helicopters from the US, four tanker aircraft from Spain, and over 600 armoured vehicles from Canada. Saudi Arabia has a long list of outstanding orders for arms, including 27 more combat aircraft from the UK, 154 combat aircraft from the US, and a large number of armoured vehicles from Canada. Saudi Arabia received 41 per cent of UK arms exports in 2010–14. France authorized $18 billion in weapons sales to Saudi Arabia in 2015 alone. The $15 billion arms deal with Saudi Arabia is believed to be the largest arms sale in Canadian history. In 2016, the European Parliament decided to temporarily impose an arms embargo against Saudi Arabia, as a result of the Yemen civilian population's suffering from the conflict with Saudi Arabia. In 2017, Saudi Arabia signed a 110 billion dollar arms deal with the United States.

Saudi Arabia is Britain's largest arms customer, with more than £4.6 billion worth of arms bought since the start of Saudi-led coalition in Yemen. A recent poll conducted by YouGov for Save the Children and Avaaz stated that 63 per cent of British people oppose the sale of weapons to Saudi.

Following the killing of Jamal Khashoggi, a nonbinding resolution was passed in the European Parliament on 25 October 2018, urging EU countries to impose an EU-wide arms embargo on Saudi Arabia. Germany became the first Western government to suspend future arms deal with the kingdom after Angela Merkel stated that "arms exports can't take place in the current circumstances."

According to the new report from the Department of Global Affairs, Canada sold record-breaking amount of military hardware to Saudi Arabia in 2019, despite its poor human rights record.

Human rights 

The Saudi government, which mandates Muslim and non-Muslim observance of Sharia law under the absolute rule of the House of Saud, has been denounced by various international organizations and governments for violating human rights within the country. The authoritarian regime ruling the Kingdom of Saudi Arabia is consistently ranked among the "worst of the worst" in Freedom House's annual survey of political and civil rights. According to Amnesty International, security forces continue to torture and ill- treat detainees to extract confessions to be used as evidence against them at trial. Saudi Arabia abstained from the United Nations vote adopting the Universal Declaration of Human Rights, saying it contradicted sharia law. Mass executions, such as those carried out in 2016, in 2019, and in 2022, have been condemned by international rights groups.

Saudi Arabian law does not recognize sexual orientations or religious freedom, and the public practice of non-Muslim religions is actively prohibited. The justice system regularly engages in capital punishment, including public executions by beheading. In line with sharia law in the Saudi justice system, the death penalty can theoretically be imposed for a wide range of offenses, including murder, rape, armed robbery, repeated drug use, apostasy, adultery, witchcraft and sorcery, and can be carried out by beheading with a sword, stoning or firing squad, followed by crucifixion (exposure of the body after execution). In 2022, the Saudi Crown Prince stated that capital punishments in Saudi Arabia will be removed "except for one category mentioned in the Quran", namely homicide, under which certain conditions must be applied. In April 2020, Saudi Supreme Court issued a directive to eliminate the punishment of flogging from the Saudi court system, and it is to be replaced by imprisonment or fines.

Historically, Saudi women faced discrimination in many aspects of their lives, and under the male guardianship system were effectively treated as legal minors. Although they made up 70% of those enrolled in universities, women comprised 5% of the workforce in Saudi Arabia, the lowest proportion in the world at the time.
The treatment of women had been referred to as "sex segregation", and "gender apartheid".

Saudi Arabia is a notable destination country for men and women trafficked for the purposes of slave labour and commercial sexual exploitation. Men and women from Central Asia, the Middle East, Africa, and many other countries voluntarily travel to Saudi Arabia as domestic servants or other low-skilled labourers, but some subsequently face conditions indicative of involuntary servitude.

In November 2022, human rights organizations said Saudi Arabia resumed secret executions for drug offences. In 2018, Crown Prince Mohammed bin Salman had vowed to "minimise" capital punishment. The regime had said that only those found guilty of a murder or of manslaughter will be sentenced to death. However, November 2022 reports revealed that the authorities executed 17 people in 10 days over non-violent drug charges. It included 7 Saudis, 4 Syrians, 3 Pakistanis and 3 Jordanians. The executions majorly including beheading with a sword, bringing the total executions of 2022 to at least 137. It exceeded the combined number of executions of 2020 and 2021.  The UN was not sure how many more people were on a death row. However, the European Saudi Organisation for Human Rights (ESOHR) said nearly 54 more people, including 8 minors, were on death row.

A report reveals that the Saudi Arabian government has infiltrated Wikipedia with the aim to control the content on the online encyclopedia. Saudi Arabia also jailed its two editors of Wikipedia Osama Khalid and Ziyad al-Sofiani for their contribution to Wikipedia posts in Arabic.

Geography 

Saudi Arabia occupies about 80 per cent of the Arabian Peninsula (the world's largest peninsula), lying between latitudes 16° and 33° N, and longitudes 34° and 56° E. Because the country's southern borders with the United Arab Emirates and Oman are not precisely marked, the exact size of the country is undefined. The United Nations Statistics Division estimates  and lists Saudi Arabia as the world's 12th largest state. It is geographically the largest country in the Middle East and the Arabian Plate.

Saudi Arabia's diverse geography is dominated by the Arabian Desert, associated semi-desert, shrubland, steppes, several mountain ranges, volcanic lava fields and highlands. The  Rub' al Khali ("Empty Quarter") in the southeastern part of the country is the world's largest contiguous sand desert. Though there are lakes in the country, Saudi Arabia is the largest country in the world by area with no permanent rivers. Wadis, non-permanent rivers, however, are very numerous. The fertile areas are to be found in the alluvial deposits in wadis, basins, and oases. The main topographical feature is the central plateau which rises abruptly from the Red Sea and gradually descends into the Nejd and toward the Persian Gulf. On the Red Sea coast, there is a narrow coastal plain, known as the Tihamah parallel to which runs an imposing escarpment. The southwest province of Asir is mountainous, and contains the  Mount Sawda, which is the highest point in the country. Saudi Arabia is home to more than 2000 dormant volcanoes.

Except for the southwestern regions such as Asir, Saudi Arabia has a desert climate with very high day-time temperatures during the summer and a sharp temperature drop at night. In the winter the temperature rarely drops below  with the exception of mostly the northern regions of the country where annual snowfall, in particular in the mountainous regions of Tabuk province, is not uncommon. The lowest recorded temperature to date, −12.0 °C (10.4 °F), was measured in Turaif.

Annual rainfall is very low. The Southern regions differ in that they are influenced by the Indian Ocean monsoons, usually occurring between October and March. Saudi Arabia is home to approximately 1300 islands.

Biodiversity 

Saudi Arabia is home to five terrestrial ecoregions: Arabian Peninsula coastal fog desert, Southwestern Arabian foothills savanna, Southwestern Arabian montane woodlands, Arabian Desert, and Red Sea Nubo-Sindian tropical desert and semi-desert.
Wildlife includes the Arabian leopard, wolf, striped hyena, mongoose, baboon, hare, sand cat, and jerboa. Animals such as gazelles, oryx, leopards and cheetahs were relatively numerous until the 19th century, when extensive hunting reduced these animals almost to extinction. The culturally important Asiatic lion occurred in Saudi Arabia until the late 19th century before it was hunted to extinction in the wild. Birds include falcons (which are caught and trained for hunting), eagles, hawks, vultures, sandgrouse, and bulbuls. There are several species of snakes, many of which are venomous. Saudi Arabia is home to a rich marine life. The Red Sea in particular is a rich and diverse ecosystem. More than 1200 species of fish have been recorded in the Red Sea, and around 10 per cent of these are found nowhere else. This also includes 42 species of deepwater fish.

The reefs form platforms and sometimes lagoons along the coast and occasional other features such as cylinders (such as the Blue Hole (Red Sea) at Dahab). These coastal reefs are also visited by pelagic species of Red Sea fish, including some of the 44 species of shark.
The Red Sea also contains many offshore reefs including several true atolls. Many of the unusual offshore reef formations defy classic (i.e., Darwinian) coral reef classification schemes, and are generally attributed to the high levels of tectonic activity that characterize the area.
Domesticated animals include the legendary Arabian horse, Arabian camel, sheep, goats, cows, donkeys, chickens, etc. Reflecting the country's dominant desert conditions, Saudi Arabia's plant life mostly consists of herbs, plants, and shrubs that require little water. The date palm (Phoenix dactylifera) is widespread.

Administrative divisions 

Saudi Arabia is divided into 13 regions (manatiq idāriyya, sing. منطقة إدارية; mintaqah idariyya). The regions are further divided into 118 governorates (muhafazat, sing. محافظة; muhafazah). This number includes the 13 regional capitals, which have a different status as municipalities (amanah) headed by mayors (amin). The governorates are further subdivided into sub-governorates (marakiz, sing. مركز; markaz).

Economy 

, Saudi Arabia is the largest economy in the Middle East and the 18th largest in the world.
Saudi Arabia has the world's second-largest proven petroleum reserves and the country is the largest exporter of petroleum. It also has the fifth-largest proven natural gas reserves. Saudi Arabia is considered an "energy superpower". It has the second highest total estimated value of natural resources, valued at US$34.4 trillion in 2016.
Saudi Arabia's command economy is petroleum-based; roughly 63% of budget revenues and 67% of export earnings come from the oil industry. It is strongly dependent on foreign workers with about 80% of those employed in the private sector being non-Saudi.
Challenges to the Saudi economy include halting or reversing the decline in per-capita income, improving education to prepare youth for the workforce and providing them with employment, diversifying the economy, stimulating the private sector and housing construction, and diminishing corruption and inequality.

The oil industry constitutes about 45% of Saudi Arabia's nominal gross domestic product, compared with 40% from the private sector (see below).

In the 1990s, Saudi Arabia experienced a significant contraction of oil revenues combined with a high rate of population growth. Per capita income fell from a high of $11,700 at the height of the oil boom in 1981 to $6,300 in 1998. Taking into account the impact of the real oil price changes on the kingdom's real gross domestic income, the real command-basis GDP was computed to be 330.381 billion 1999 USD in 2010. Increases in oil prices in the early 2000s helped boost per capita GDP to $17,000 in 2007 dollars (about $7,400 adjusted for inflation), but have declined since oil price drop in mid-2014.

OPEC (the Organization of Petroleum Exporting Countries) limits its members' oil production based on their "proven reserves." Matthew Simmons has suggested that Saudi Arabia is greatly exaggerating its reserves and may soon show production declines (see peak oil).

From 2003 to 2013, "several key services" were privatized—municipal water supply, electricity, telecommunications—and parts of education and health care, traffic control and car accident reporting were also privatized. According to Arab News columnist Abdel Aziz Aluwaisheg, "in almost every one of these areas, consumers have raised serious concerns about the performance of these privatized entities." The Tadawul All Share Index (TASI) of the Saudi stock exchange peaked at 16,712.64 in 2005, and closed at 8,535.60, at the end of 2013. In November 2005, Saudi Arabia was approved as a member of the World Trade Organization. Negotiations to join had focused on the degree to which Saudi Arabia is willing to increase market access to foreign goods and in 2000, the government established the Saudi Arabian General Investment Authority to encourage foreign direct investment in the kingdom. Saudi Arabia maintains a list of sectors in which foreign investment is prohibited, but the government plans to open some closed sectors such as telecommunications, insurance, and power transmission/distribution over time. The government has also made an attempt at "Saudizing" the economy, replacing foreign workers with Saudi nationals with limited success.

In addition to petroleum and gas, Saudi also has a significant gold mining sector in the ancient Mahd adh Dhahab region and significant other mineral industries, an agricultural sector (especially in the southwest but not only) based on vegetables, fruits, dates etc. and livestock, and large number of temporary jobs created by the roughly two million annual hajj pilgrims.
Saudi Arabia has had five-year "Development Plans" since 1970. Among its plans were to launch "economic cities" (e.g. King Abdullah Economic City) to be completed by 2020, in an effort to diversify the economy and provide jobs.  four cities were planned. The King has announced that the per capita income is forecast to rise from $15,000 in 2006 to $33,500 in 2020. The cities will be spread around Saudi Arabia to promote diversification for each region and their economy, and the cities are projected to contribute $150 billion to the GDP.

Saudi Arabia is increasingly activating its ports in order to participate in trade between Europe and China in addition to oil transport. To this end, ports such as Jeddah Islamic Port or King Abdullah Economic City are being rapidly expanded and investments are being made in logistics. The country is historically and currently part of the Maritime Silk Road that runs from the Chinese coast to the south via the southern tip of India to Mombasa, from there through the Red Sea via the Suez Canal to the Mediterranean, there to the Upper Adriatic region to the northern Italian hub of Trieste with its rail connections to Central Europe, Eastern Europe and the North Sea.

Statistics on poverty in the kingdom are not available through the UN resources because the Saudi government does not issue any. The Saudi state discourages calling attention to or complaining about poverty. In December 2011, the Saudi interior ministry arrested three reporters and held them for almost two weeks for questioning after they uploaded a video on the topic to YouTube. Authors of the video claim that 22 per cent of Saudis may be considered poor (2009). Observers researching the issue prefer to stay anonymous because of the risk of being arrested.

In September 2018, the Public Investment Fund completed a deal with a group of global lenders for a loan of $11 billion. The deal raised more than initially planned and was the first time the PIF had incorporated loans and debt instruments into its funding. According to data from Fitch Ratings, over two years starting from May 2016 Saudi Arabia went from having zero debt to raising $68 billion in dollar-denominated bonds and syndicated loans—one of the fastest rates among emerging economies.

Each year, about a quarter-million young Saudis enter the job market. With the first phase of Saudization into effect, 70% of sales jobs are expected to be filled by Saudis. However, the private sector still remains hugely dominated by foreigners. The rate of local unemployment is 12.9%, its highest in more than a decade. According to a report published by Bloomberg Economics in 2018, the government needs to produce 700,000 jobs by 2020 to meet its 9% unemployment target.

The unexpected impact of COVID-19 pandemic on the economy, along with Saudi Arabia's poor human rights records, laid unforeseen challenges before the development plans of the kingdom, where some of the programs under 'Vision 2030' were also expected to be affected. On 2 May, the Finance Minister of Saudi Arabia admitted that the country's economy was facing a severe economical crisis for the first time in decades, due to the pandemic as well as declining global oil markets. Mohammed Al-Jadaan said that the country will take "painful" measures and keep all options open to deal with the impact.

Agriculture 

Serious large-scale agricultural development began in the 1970s. The government launched an extensive program to promote modern farming technology; to establish rural roads, irrigation networks and storage and export facilities; and to encourage agricultural research and training institutions.
As a result, there has been a phenomenal growth in the production of all basic foods. Saudi Arabia is now completely self-sufficient in a number of foodstuffs, including meat, milk, and eggs.
The country exports wheat, dates, dairy products, eggs, fish, poultry, fruits, vegetables, and flowers to markets around the world. Dates, once a staple of the Saudi diet, are now mainly grown for global humanitarian aid.
In addition, Saudi farmers grow substantial amounts of other grains such as barley, sorghum, and millet. As of 2016, in the interest of preserving precious water resources, domestic production of wheat has ended.

The Kingdom likewise has some of the most modern and largest dairy farms in the Middle East. The local dairy manufacturing company Almarai is the largest vertically integrated dairy company in the Middle East.

The Kingdom's most dramatic agricultural accomplishment, noted worldwide, was its rapid transformation from importer to exporter of wheat. In 1978, the country built its first grain silos. By 1984, it had become self-sufficient in wheat. Shortly thereafter, Saudi Arabia began exporting wheat to some 30 countries, including China and the former Soviet Union, and in the major producing areas of Tabuk, Hail, and Qasim, average yields reached .
The Kingdom has, however, stepped up fruit and vegetable production, by improving both agricultural techniques and the roads that link farmers with urban consumers. Saudi Arabia is a major exporter of fruits and vegetables to its neighbours. Among its most productive crops are watermelon, grapes, citrus fruits, onions, squash, and tomatoes. At Jizan in the country's well-watered southwest, the Al-Hikmah Research Station is producing tropical fruits including pineapples, paw-paws, bananas, mangoes, and guavas.

The olive tree is indigenous to Saudi Arabia. In 2018, the Al Jouf Agricultural Development Company received a certificate of merit from The Guinness World Records for the largest modern olive plantation in the world. The farm covers 7730 hectares and has 5 million olive trees. Also, the Guinness World Records took their production capacity of 15000 tonnes of high-quality olive oil into consideration, while the kingdom consumes double that.
The Al Jouf farms are located in Sakaka, a city in the north-western part of Saudi Arabia, which is a deeply-rooted in history. Sakaka dates back more than 4,000 years. The Al Jouf region has millions of olive trees and the expected number is expected to go up to 20 million trees soon. Consuming non-renewable groundwater resulted in the loss of an estimated four-fifths of the total groundwater reserves by 2012.

Water supply and sanitation 

Water supply and sanitation in Saudi Arabia is characterized by challenges and achievements. One of the main challenges is water scarcity. In order to overcome water scarcity, substantial investments have been undertaken in seawater desalination, water distribution, sewerage and wastewater treatment. Today about 50% of drinking water comes from desalination, 40% from the mining of non-renewable groundwater and only 10% from surface water in the mountainous southwest of the country. Saudi Arabia is suffering from a major depletion of the water in its underground aquifers and a resultant break down and disintegration of its agriculture as a consequence. As a result of the catastrophe, Saudi Arabia has bought agricultural land in the United States, Argentina, and Africa. Saudi Arabia ranked as a major buyer of agricultural land in foreign countries.

According to the Joint Monitoring Program (JMP) for Water Supply and Sanitation of the WHO and UNICEF, the latest reliable source on access to water and sanitation in Saudi Arabia is the 2004 census. It indicates that 97% of the population had access to an improved source of drinking water and 99% had access to improved sanitation. For 2015, the JMP estimates that access to sanitation increased to 100%. Sanitation was primarily through on-site solutions and only about 40% of the population was connected to sewers. In 2015, still 886 thousand people lacked access to "improved" water.

Tourism 

Although most tourism in Saudi Arabia still largely involves religious pilgrimages, there is growth in the leisure tourism sector. According to the World Bank, approximately 14.3 million people visited Saudi Arabia in 2012, making it the world's 19th-most-visited country. Tourism is an important component of the Saudi Vision 2030 and according to a report conducted by BMI Research in 2018, both religious and non-religious tourism have significant potential for expansion.

Starting December 2018, the kingdom offers an electronic visa for foreign visitors to attend sports events and concerts. The "sharek" visa process started on 15 December 2018 when the Saudi Ad Diriyah E Prix race started. In September 2019, the kingdom announced its plans to open visa applications for visitors, where people from about 50 countries would be able to get tourist visas to Saudi. In January 2020, it was announced that holders of a US, UK or Schengen visa are eligible for a Saudi electronic visa upon arrival.

Demographics 

The population of Saudi Arabia as of July 2013 was estimated to be 26.9 million, including between 5.5 million and 10 million non-nationalized immigrants, though the Saudi population has long proved difficult to accurately estimate due to Saudi leaders' historical tendency to inflate census results. Saudi population has grown rapidly since 1950 when it was estimated to be 3 million, and for many years had one of the highest population growth rates in the world at around 3 per cent a year.

The ethnic composition of Saudi citizens is 90% Arab and 10% Afro-Arab. Most Saudis live in the Hejaz (35%), Najd (28%), and the Eastern Province (15%). Hejaz is the most populated region in Saudi Arabia.

As late as 1970, most Saudis lived a subsistence life in the rural provinces, but in the last half of the 20th century, the kingdom has urbanized rapidly.  about 80% of Saudis live in urban metropolitan areas—specifically Riyadh, Jeddah, or Dammam.

Its population is also quite young with over half the population under 25 years old. A large fraction are foreign nationals. (The CIA Factbook estimated that  foreign nationals living in Saudi Arabia made up about 21% of the population. Other estimates are 30% or 33%) Immigrants make up 38.3% of the total population, according to UN data (2019), mostly coming from the Middle East, Asia, and Africa. As recently as the early 1960s, Saudi Arabia's slave population was estimated at 300,000. Slavery was officially abolished in 1962.

Languages 
The official language of Saudi Arabia is Arabic. The three main regional variants spoken by Saudis are Najdi Arabic (about 14.6 million speakers), Hejazi Arabic (about 10.3 million speakers), and Gulf Arabic (about 0.96 million speakers). Faifi is spoken by about 50,000. The Mehri language is also spoken by around 20,000 Mehri citizens. Saudi Sign Language is the principal language of the deaf community, amounting to around 100,000 speakers. The large expatriate communities also speak their own languages, the most numerous of which, according to 2018 data, are Bengali (~1,500,000), Tagalog (~900,000), Punjabi (~800,000), Urdu (~740,000), Egyptian Arabic (~600,000), Rohingya, North Levantine Arabic (both ~500,000) and Malayalam.

Religions 

Virtually all Saudi citizens are Muslim (officially, all are), and almost all Saudi residents are Muslim. Estimates of the Sunni population of Saudi Arabia range between 85% and 90%, with the remaining 10–15% being Shia Muslim, practicing either Twelver Shi'ism or Sulaymani Ismailism. The official and dominant form of Sunni Islam in Saudi Arabia is commonly known as Wahhabism (proponents prefer the name Salafism, considering Wahhabi derogatory), which was founded in the Arabian Peninsula by Muhammad ibn Abd al-Wahhab in the 18th century. Other denominations, such as the minority Shia Islam, are systematically suppressed.

According to estimates there are about 1,500,000 Christians in Saudi Arabia, almost all foreign workers. Saudi Arabia allows Christians to enter the country as foreign workers for temporary work, but does not allow them to practice their faith openly. The percentage of Saudi Arabian citizens who are Christians is officially zero, as Saudi Arabia forbids religious conversion from Islam (apostasy) and punishes it by death. According to Pew Research Center there are 390,000 Hindus in Saudi Arabia, almost all foreign workers. There may be a significant fraction of atheists and agnostics in Saudi Arabia, although they are officially called "terrorists". In its 2017 religious freedom report, the US State Department named Saudi Arabia a Country of Particular Concern (CPC).

Education 

Education is free at all levels, although higher education is restricted to citizens only. The school system is composed of elementary, intermediate, and secondary schools. Classes are segregated by sex. At secondary level, students are able to choose from 3 types of schools: general education, vocational and technical, or religious. The rate of literacy is 99% among males and 96% among females in 2020. For the youth, literacy rate rose up to approximately 99.5% for both sexes.

According to the educational plan for secondary (high school) education 1435–1438 Hijri, students enrolling in the "natural sciences" path are required to take five religion subjects which are tawhid, fiqh, tafsir, hadith and Islamic education and Quran. However, in 2021 the Saudi Ministry of Education merged the multiple Islamic subjects into one single book as part of a series of reforms to revamp the school education system. In addition, students are required to take six science subjects which are maths, physics, chemistry, biology, geology and computer.

Higher education has expanded rapidly, with large numbers of universities and colleges being founded particularly since 2000. Institutions of higher education include the country's first university, King Saud University founded in 1957, the Islamic University at Medina founded in 1961, and the King Abdulaziz University in Jeddah founded in 1967. Princess Norah University, the largest women's university in the world, was founded in 1970. King Abdullah University of Science and Technology, known as KAUST, is the first mixed-gender university campus in Saudi Arabia and was founded in 2009. Other colleges and universities emphasize curricula in sciences and technology, military studies, religion, and medicine. Institutes devoted to Islamic studies, in particular, abound. Women typically receive college instruction in segregated institutions.

The Academic Ranking of World Universities, known as Shanghai Ranking, ranked 4 Saudi institutions among its 2021 list of the 500 top universities in the world. The QS World University Rankings lists 14 Saudi universities among the 2022 world’s top universities and 23 universities among the top 100 in the Arab world. The 2022 list of U.S. News & World Report Best Global University Ranking ranked King Abdulaziz University among the top 50 universities in the world and King Abdullah University of Science and Technology among the top 100 universities in the world.

In 2018, Saudi Arabia ranked 28th worldwide in terms of high-quality research output according to the scientific journal Nature.
This makes Saudi Arabia the best performing Middle Eastern, Arab, and Muslim country. Saudi Arabia spends 8.8% of its gross domestic product on education, compared with the global average of 4.6%. Saudi Arabia was ranked 66th in the Global Innovation Index in 2021, up from 68th in 2019.

Memorization by rote of large parts of the Qur'an, its interpretation and understanding (Tafsir) and the application of Islamic tradition to everyday life is at the core of the curriculum. Religion taught in this manner is also a compulsory subject for all University students. As a consequence, Saudi youth "generally lacks the education and technical skills the private sector needs" according to the CIA. Similarly, The Chronicle of Higher Education wrote in 2010 that "the country needs educated young Saudis with marketable skills and a capacity for innovation and entrepreneurship. That's not generally what Saudi Arabia's educational system delivers, steeped as it is in rote learning and religious instruction."

The religious sector of the Saudi national curriculum was examined in a 2006 report by Freedom House which concluded that "the Saudi public school religious curriculum continues to propagate an ideology of hate toward the 'unbeliever', that is, Christians, Jews, Shiites, Sufis, Sunni Muslims who do not follow Wahhabi doctrine, Hindus, atheists and others". The Saudi religious studies curriculum is taught outside the kingdom via Saudi-linked madrasah, schools, and clubs throughout the world. Critics have described the education system as "medieval" and that its primary goal "is to maintain the rule of absolute monarchy by casting it as the ordained protector of the faith, and that Islam is at war with other faiths and cultures". This radical teaching takes place in Saudi funded mosques and madrasas across the Islamic world from Morocco to Pakistan to Indonesia.

The approach taken in the Saudi education system has been accused of encouraging Islamic terrorism, leading to reform efforts. Following the 9/11 attacks, the government aimed to tackle the twin problems of encouraging extremism and the inadequacy of the country's university education for a modern economy, by slowly modernising the education system through the "Tatweer" reform program. The Tatweer program is reported to have a budget of approximately US$2 billion and focuses on moving teaching away from the traditional Saudi methods of memorization and rote learning towards encouraging students to analyse and problem-solve. It also aims to create an education system which will provide a more secular and vocationally based training.

In 2021, the Washington Post newspaper published a report on the measures taken by Saudi Arabia to clean textbooks from paragraphs considered antisemitic and sexist. The paragraphs dealing with the punishment of homosexuality or same-sex relations have been deleted, and expressions of admiration for the extremist martyrdom. Antisemitic expressions and calls to fight the Jews became fewer. David Weinberg, director of international affairs for the Anti-Defamation League, said that references to demonizing Jews, Christians, and Shiites have been removed from some places or have toned down, noting the deletion of paragraphs that talk about killing gays, infidels and witches. The US State Department expressed in an email that it welcomed the changes to the materials affecting Saudi educational curricula. The Saudi Ministry of Foreign Affairs supports a training program for Saudi teachers.

Health care 

Health care in Saudi Arabia is a national health care system in which the government provides free health care services through a number of government agencies. Saudi Arabia has been ranked among the 26 best countries in providing high quality healthcare.

The Saudi Ministry of Health (MOH) is the major government agency entrusted with the provision of preventive, curative, and rehabilitative health care for the kingdom's population. The Ministry's origins can be traced to 1925, when a number of regional health departments were established, with the first in Makkah, Saudi Arabia. The various healthcare institutions were merged to become a ministerial body in 1950. Abdullah bin Faisal Al Saud was the first health minister and served in the position for three years, with his main role to set up the newly formed Ministry.

The Health Ministry created a friendly competition between each of the districts, and between different medical services and hospitals. This idea resulted in the creation of the "Ada'a" project launched in 2016. The new system is a nationwide performance indicator, for services and hospitals. Following the implementation of the new KPI tables, waiting times and other major measurements improved dramatically across the Kingdom.

A new strategy has been developed by the Ministry, known as Diet and Physical Activity Strategy or DPAS for short. Many lifestyle issues in the country were causing bad lifestyle choices. This led to the Ministry advising that there should be a tax increase on unhealthy food, drink and also cigarettes in the region. This additional tax could be used to improve healthcare offerings. The tax was implemented in 2017. As part of the same strategy, calorie labels were added in 2019 to a number of food and drink products. Ingredients were also listed, not as an aim to reduce obesity, but also for citizens with health issues, to manage their diet. As part of the ongoing focus on tackling obesity, women-only gyms were allowed to open in 2017. A number of sports were offered in each of these gyms, including bodybuilding, running and swimming to maintain higher standards of health.

Smoking in Saudi-Arabia in all age groups was widespread. In 2009 the lowest median percentage of smokers was university students (~13.5%) while the highest was elderly people (~25%). The study also found the median percentage of male smokers to be much higher than that of females (~26.5% for males, ~9% for females). Before 2010, Saudi Arabia had no policies banning or restricting smoking.

The MOH has been awarded "Healthy City" certificates by the World Health Organization (WHO) for the cities of Unayzah and Riyadh Al Khabra as 4th and 5th Healthy Cities in Saudi Arabia.
The WHO had earlier classified three Saudi Arabian cities, Ad Diriyah, Jalajil, and Al-Jamoom as "Healthy city", as part of the WHO Healthy Cities Program. Recently Al-Baha has also been classified as a healthy city to join the list of global healthy cities approved by the World Health Organization.

In May 2019, the then Saudi Minister of Health Dr. Tawfiq bin Fawzan AlRabiah received a global award on behalf of the Kingdom for combatting smoking through social awareness, treatment, and application of regulations. The award was presented as part of the 72nd session of the World Health Assembly, held in Geneva in May 2019. After becoming one of the first nations to ratify the WHO Framework Convention on Tobacco Control in 2005, it plans to reduce tobacco use from 12.7% in 2017, to 5% in 2030.

Saudi Arabia has a life expectancy of 74.99 years (73.79 for males and 76.61 for females) according to the latest data for the year 2018 from the World Bank. Infant mortality in 2019 was 5.7 per 1,000. In 2016, 69.7% of the adult population was overweight and 35.5% was obese.

Foreigners 

Saudi Arabia's Central Department of Statistics & Information estimated the foreign population at the end of 2014 at 33% (10.1 million). The CIA Factbook estimated that  foreign nationals living in Saudi Arabia made up about 21% of the population. Other sources report differing estimates. Indian: 1.5 million, Pakistani: 1.3 million, Egyptian: 900,000, Yemeni: 800,000, Bangladeshi: 400,000, Filipino: 500,000, Jordanian/Palestinian: 260,000, Indonesian: 250,000, Sri Lankan: 350,000, Sudanese: 250,000, Syrian: 100,000 and Turkish: 80,000.

According to The Guardian,  there were more than half a million foreign-born domestic workers in Saudi Arabia. Most have backgrounds in poverty and come from Africa, the Indian subcontinent and Southeast Asia. To go to work in Saudi Arabia, they must often pay large sums to recruitment agencies in their home countries. The agencies then handle the necessary legal paperwork.

As the Saudi population grows and oil export revenues stagnate, pressure for "Saudization" (the replacement of foreign workers with Saudis) has grown, and the Saudi government hopes to decrease the number of foreign nationals in the country. Saudi Arabia expelled 800,000 Yemenis in 1990 and 1991 and has built a Saudi–Yemen barrier against an influx of illegal immigrants and against the smuggling of drugs and weapons. In November 2013, Saudi Arabia expelled thousands of illegal Ethiopian residents from the kingdom. Various Human Rights entities have criticized Saudi Arabia's handling of the issue.

Over 500,000 undocumented migrant workers—mostly from Somalia, Ethiopia, and Yemen—have been detained and deported since 2013. An investigation led by The Sunday Telegraph, exposed the condition of African migrants who were detained in Saudi Arabia allegedly for containing COVID-19 in the kingdom. They were beaten, tortured, and electrocuted. Many of the migrants died due to heatstroke or by attempting suicide, after being severely beaten and tortured. The migrants lack proper living conditions, provision of food and water.

Foreigners cannot apply for permanent residency, though a specialized Premium Residency visa became available in 2019. Only Muslims can become Saudi citizens. Foreigners who have resided in the kingdom and hold degrees in various scientific fields may apply for Saudi citizenship, and exception made for Palestinians who are excluded unless married to a male Saudi national, because of Arab League instructions barring the Arab states from granting them citizenship. Saudi Arabia is not a signatory to the 1951 UN Refugee Convention.

Culture 

Saudi Arabia has centuries-old attitudes and traditions, often derived from Arab civilization. The main factors that influence the culture of Saudi Arabia are Islamic heritage and Bedouin traditions as well as its historical role as an ancient trade centre.

Religion in society 

Religion is a core aspect of everyday life in Saudi Arabia. It plays a dominant role in the country's governance and legal system, deeply influences culture and daily life, although the power of the religious establishment has been significantly eroded in the 2010s. The Hejaz region, where the Islamic holy cities of Mecca and Medina are located, is the destination of the Ḥajj pilgrimage, and often deemed to be the cradle of Islam.

Islam is the state religion of Saudi Arabia. There is no law that requires all citizens to be Muslim, but non-Muslims and many foreign and Saudi Muslims whose beliefs are deemed not to conform with the government's interpretation of Islam must practice their religion in private and are vulnerable to discrimination, harassment, detention, and, for foreigners, deportation. Neither Saudi citizens nor guest workers have the right of freedom of religion. The dominant form of Islam in the kingdom—Wahhabism—arose in the central region of Najd, in the 18th century. Proponents call the movement "Salafism", and believe that its teachings purify the practice of Islam of innovations or practices that deviate from the seventh-century teachings of Muhammad and his companions. The Saudi government has often been viewed as an active oppressor of Shia Muslims because of the funding of the Wahhabi ideology which denounces the Shia faith. Prince Bandar bin Sultan, Saudi ambassador to the United States, stated: "The time is not far off in the Middle East when it will be literally 'God help the Shia'. More than a billion Sunnis have simply had enough of them."

Saudi Arabia is one of the few countries that have "religious police" (known as Haia or Mutaween), who patrol the streets "enjoining good and forbidding wrong" by enforcing dress codes, strict separation of men and women, attendance at prayer (salat) five times each day, the ban on alcohol, and other aspects of Sharia (Islamic law). However, since 2016 the power of religious police was curbed, which barred them from pursuing, questioning, requesting identification or arresting suspects. In the privacy of homes, behaviour can be far looser, and reports from WikiLeaks indicate that low ranked members of the ruling Saudi Royal family indulge in parties with alcohol, drugs, and prostitutes.

Until 2016, the kingdom only used the lunar Islamic calendar, not the international Gregorian calendar, but in 2016 the kingdom announced its switch to the Gregorian calendar for civil purposes. Daily life is influenced by Islamic observance. Some businesses decide to close three or four times a day for 30 to 45 minutes during business hours while employees and customers are sent off to pray. The weekend is Friday-Saturday, not Saturday-Sunday because Friday is the holiest day for Muslims. For many years only two religious holidays were publicly recognized – ʿĪd al-Fiṭr and ʿĪd al-Aḍḥā. (ʿĪd al-Fiṭr is "the biggest" holiday, a three-day period of "feasting, gift-giving and general letting go").

In 2004, approximately half of the broadcast airtime of Saudi state television was devoted to religious issues. 90 per cent of books published in the kingdom were on religious subjects, and most of the doctorates awarded by its universities were in Islamic studies. In the state school system, about half of the material taught is religious. In contrast, assigned readings over 12 years of primary and secondary schooling devoted to covering the history, literature, and cultures of the non-Muslim world come to a total of about 40 pages.

"Fierce religious resistance" had to be overcome to permit such innovations as paper money (in 1951), female education (1964), and television (1965) and the abolition of slavery (1962). Public support for the traditional political/religious structure of the kingdom is so strong that one researcher interviewing Saudis found virtually no support for reforms to secularize the state.

Celebration of other (non-Wahhabi) Islamic holidays, such as the Muhammad's birthday and the Day of Ashura, (an important holiday for the 10–25 per cent of the population that is Shīʿa Muslim), are tolerated only when celebrated locally and on a small scale. Shias also face systematic discrimination in employment, education, the justice system according to Human Rights Watch. Non-Muslim festivals like Christmas, Easter, Halloween, and New Year were not tolerated until recently. No churches, temples or other non-Muslim houses of worship are permitted in the country. Proselytizing by non-Muslims and conversion by Muslims to another religion is illegal, and  the distribution of "publications that have prejudice to any other religious belief other than Islam" (such as Bibles), was reportedly punishable by death. In legal compensation court cases (Diyya) non-Muslim are awarded less than Muslims. Atheists are legally designated as terrorists. At least one religious minority, the Ahmadiyya Muslims, had its adherents deported, as they are legally banned from entering the country.

In a recent move to promote a modern image, Saudi Arabia banned the religious group known as 'Tablighi Jamaat'. The announcement was made on social media by the country's Minister of Islamic Affairs who warned people against association during the Friday sermon.

Women in society 

Throughout history, women did not have equal rights to men in the kingdom; the U.S. State Department considers Saudi Arabian government's discrimination against women a "significant problem" in Saudi Arabia and notes that women have few political rights due to the government's discriminatory policies. However, since Mohammed bin Salman was appointed Crown Prince in 2017, a series of social reforms have been witnessed regarding women's rights.

Under previous Saudi law, all females were required to have a male guardian, typically a father, brother, husband, or uncle. In 2019, this law was partially amended to exclude women over 21 years old from the requirement of a male guardian. The new amendment also granted women rights in relation to the guardianship of minor children. Previously, girls and women were forbidden from traveling, conducting official business, or undergoing certain medical procedures without permission from their male guardians. In 2019, Saudi Arabia allowed women to travel abroad, register for divorce or marriage, and apply for official documents without the permission of a male guardian.

In 2006, Wajeha al-Huwaider, a leading Saudi feminist and journalist said "Saudi women are weak, no matter how high their status, even the 'pampered' ones among them, because they have no law to protect them from attack by anyone." Following this, Saudi Arabia implemented the anti-domestic violence law in 2014. Furthermore, between 2017 and 2020, the country addressed issues of mobility, sexual harassment, pensions, and employment-discrimination protections.  al-Huwaider and other female activists have applauded the general direction in which the country was headed.

Women face discrimination in the courts, where the testimony of one man equals that of two women in family and inheritance law. Polygamy is permitted for men, and men have a unilateral right to divorce their wives (talaq) without needing any legal justification. A woman can only obtain a divorce with the consent of her husband or judicially if her husband has harmed her. However, in 2022, women were granted the right to divorce and without the approval of a legal guardian under the new Personal Status Law. With regard to the law of inheritance, the Quran specifies that fixed portions of the deceased's estate must be left to the Qur'anic heirs and generally, female heirs receive half the portion of male heirs.

Obesity is a problem among middle and upper-class Saudis who have domestic servants to do traditional work but, until 2018, women were forbidden to drive and so they were limited in their ability to leave their home. As of April 2014, Saudi authorities in the education ministry have been asked by the Shoura Council to consider lifting a state school ban on sports for girls with the proviso that any sports conform to Sharia rules on dress and gender segregation, according to the official SPA news agency. The religious police, known as the mutawa, imposed many restrictions on women in public in Saudi Arabia. The restrictions include forcing women to sit in separate specially designated family sections in restaurants, to wear an abaya and to cover their hair. However, in 2016, the Saudi cabinet has drastically reduced the power of the religious police and barred it "from pursuing, questioning, asking for identification, arresting and detaining anyone suspected of a crime", making them effectively "non-existent" in the public sphere anymore.

A few Saudi women have risen to the top of the medical profession; for example, Dr. Ghada Al-Mutairi heads a medical research centre in California and Dr. Salwa Al-Hazzaa is head of the ophthalmology department at King Faisal Specialist Hospital in Riyadh and was the late King Fahad's personal ophthalmologist.

Heritage sites 

Saudi Wahhabism is hostile to any reverence given to historical or religious places of significance for fear that it may give rise to 'shirk' (idolatry), and the most significant historic Muslim sites (in Mecca and Medina) are located in the western Saudi region of the Hejaz. As a consequence, under Saudi rule, an estimated 95% of Mecca's historic buildings, most over a thousand years old, have been demolished for religious reasons. Critics claim that over the last 50 years, 300 historic sites linked to Muhammad, his family or companions have been lost, leaving fewer than 20 structures remaining in Mecca that date back to the time of Muhammad. Demolished structures include the mosque originally built by Muhammad's daughter Fatima, and other mosques founded by Abu Bakr (Muhammad's father-in-law and the first Caliph), Umar (the second Caliph), Ali (Muhammad's son-in-law and the fourth Caliph), and Salman al-Farsi (another of Muhammad's companions).

Six cultural sites in Saudi Arabia are designated as UNESCO World Heritage Sites: Al-Hijr Archaeological Site (Madâin Sâlih); the Turaif district in the city of Diriyah; Historic Jeddah, the Gate to Mecca; Al-Ahsa Oasis; Rock Art in the Hail Region; and Ḥimā Cultural Area. Ten other sites submitted requests for recognition to UNESCO in 2015.

There are six elements inscribed on UNESCO's Intangible Cultural Heritage of Humanity list: Al-Qatt Al-Asiri, female traditional interior wall decoration in Asir; Almezmar, drumming and dancing with sticks; Falconry, a living human heritage; Arabic coffee, a symbol of generosity; Majlis, a cultural and social space; Alardah Alnajdiyah, dance, drumming and poetry in Saudi Arabia.

In June 2014, the Council of Ministers approved a law that gives the Saudi Commission for Tourism and National Heritage the means to protect Saudi Arabia's ancient relics and historic sites. Within the framework of the 2016 National Transformation Program, also known as Saudi Vision 2030, the kingdom allocated 900 million euros to preserve its historical and cultural heritage. Saudi Arabia also participates in the International Alliance for the Protection of Heritage in Conflict Areas (ALIPH), created in March 2017, with a contribution of 18.5 million euros.

In 2017, Crown Prince Mohammad bin Salman promised to return Saudi Arabia to the "moderate Islam" of the era before the 1979 Iranian revolution. A new centre, the King Salman Complex for the Prophet's Hadith, was established that year to monitor interpretations of the Prophet Mohammed's hadiths to prevent them being used to justifying terrorism.

In March 2018, the Crown Prince met the Archbishop of Canterbury during a visit to the UK, pledging to promote interfaith dialogue. In Riyadh the following month King Salman met the head of the Vatican's Pontifical Council for Interreligious Dialogue. In July 2019, UNESCO signed a letter with the Saudi Minister of Culture in which Saudi Arabia contributed US$25 million to UNESCO for the preservation of heritage.

Dress 

Saudi Arabian dress strictly follows the principles of hijab (the Islamic principle of modesty, especially in dress). The predominantly loose and flowing, but covering, garments are suited to Saudi Arabia's desert climate. Traditionally, men usually wear a white ankle-length garment woven from wool or cotton (known as a thawb), with a keffiyeh (a large checkered square of cotton held in place by an agal) or a ghutra (a plain white square made of a finer cotton, also held in place by an agal) worn on the head. For rare chilly days, Saudi men wear a camel-hair cloak (bisht) over the top. In public women are required to wear a black abaya or other black clothing that covers everything under the neck with the exception of their hands and feet, although most women cover their head in respect of their religion. This requirement applies to non-Muslim women too and failure to abide can result in police action, particularly in more conservative areas of the country. Women's clothes are often decorated with tribal motifs, coins, sequins, metallic thread, and appliques.
 Ghutrah is a traditional headdress typically worn by Arab men. It is made of a square of cloth ("scarf"), usually cotton, folded and wrapped in various styles around the head. It is commonly worn in areas with an arid climate, to provide protection from direct sun exposure, and also protection of the mouth and eyes from blown dust and sand.
 Agal is an item of Arab headgear constructed of cord which is fastened around the Ghutrah to hold it in place. The agal is usually black in colour.
 Thawb is the standard Arabic word for garment. It is ankle-length, usually with long sleeves, similar to a robe.
 Bisht is a traditional Arabic men's cloak usually only worn for prestige on special occasions such as weddings.
 Abaya is a woman's garment. It is a black cloak that loosely covers the entire body except for the head. Some women choose to cover their faces with a niqāb and some do not. Some abayas cover the top of the head as well.

Arts and entertainment 

During the 1970s, cinemas were numerous in the kingdom although they were seen as contrary to Wahhabi norms. During the Islamic revival movement in the 1980s, and as a political response to an increase in Islamist activism including the 1979 seizure of the Grand Mosque in Mecca, the government closed all cinemas and theatres. However, with King Abdullah and King Salman's reforms, cinemas re-opened, including one in KAUST.

From the 18th century onward, Wahhabi fundamentalism discouraged artistic development inconsistent with its teaching. In addition, Sunni Islamic prohibition of creating representations of people have limited the visual arts, which tend to be dominated by geometric, floral, and abstract designs and by calligraphy. With the advent of the oil-wealth in the 20th century came exposure to outside influences, such as Western housing styles, furnishings, and clothes. Music and dance have always been part of Saudi life. Traditional music is generally associated with poetry and is sung collectively. Instruments include the rabābah, an instrument not unlike a three-string fiddle, and various types of percussion instruments, such as the ṭabl (drum) and the ṭār (tambourine). Of the native dances, the most popular is a martial line dance known as the arḍah, which includes lines of men, frequently armed with swords or rifles, dancing to the beat of drums and tambourines. Bedouin poetry, known as nabaṭī, is still very popular.

Censorship has limited the development of Saudi literature, although several Saudi novelists and poets have achieved critical and popular acclaim in the Arab world—albeit generating official hostility in their home country. These include Ghazi Algosaibi, Mansour al-Nogaidan, Abdelrahman Munif, Turki al-Hamad and Rajaa al-Sanea. In 2016, the General Entertainment Authority was formed to oversee the expansion of the Saudi entertainment sector.
The first concerts in Riyadh for 25 years took place the following year. Other events since the GEA's creation have included comedy shows, professional wrestling events and monster truck rallies. In 2018 the first public cinema opened after a ban of 35 years, with plans to have more than 2,000 screens running by 2030.

Developments in the arts in 2018 included Saudi Arabia's debut appearances at the Cannes Film Festival and the Venice Biennale. Guetta's comments come as Saudi Arabia increasingly attracts big name western music acts to perform in the kingdom.

Cuisine 

Saudi Arabian cuisine is similar to that of the surrounding countries in the Arabian Peninsula and the wider Arab world, and has influenced and been influenced by Turkish, Indian, Persian, and African food. Islamic dietary laws are enforced: pork is not allowed and other animals are slaughtered in accordance with halal. Kebabs and falafel are popular, as is shāwarmā (shawarma), a marinated grilled meat dish of lamb, mutton, or chicken. As in other Arab countries of the Arabian Peninsula, machbūs (kabsa), a rice dish with lamb, chicken, fish or shrimp, is among the national dishes as well as the dish mandi. Flat, unleavened taboon bread is a staple of virtually every meal, as are dates, fresh fruit, yoghurt, and hummus. Coffee, served in the Arabic style, is the traditional beverage but tea and various fruit juices are popular as well. Arabic coffee is a traditional beverage in Arabian cuisine. The earliest substantiated evidence of either coffee drinking or knowledge of the coffee tree is from the 15th century, in the Sufi monasteries of Arabia.

Sport 

Football is the national sport in Saudi Arabia. The Saudi Arabia national football team is considered one of Asia's most successful national teams, having reached a joint record 6 AFC Asian Cup finals, winning three of those finals (1984, 1988, and 1996) and having qualified for the World Cup four consecutive times ever since debuting at the 1994 tournament.

In the 1994 FIFA World Cup under the leadership of Jorge Solari, Saudi Arabia beat both Belgium and Morocco in the group stage before falling to defeat Sweden in the round of 16. During the 1992 FIFA Confederations Cup, which was played in Saudi Arabia, the country reached the final, losing 1–3 to Argentina.
Scuba diving, windsurfing, sailing and basketball (which is played by both men and women) are also popular with the Saudi Arabian national basketball team winning bronze at the 1999 Asian Championship. More traditional sports such as horse racing and camel racing are also popular. A stadium in Riyadh holds races in the winter. The annual King's Camel Race, begun in 1974, is one of the sport's most important contests and attracts animals and riders from throughout the region. Falconry, another traditional pursuit, is still practised.

Women's sport is controversial due to the suppression of female participation in sport by conservative Islamic religious authorities, however the restrictions have eased since then. Until 2018 women were not permitted in sport stadiums. Segregated seating, allowing women to enter, has been developed in three stadiums across major cities. Since 2020, the progress of women's integration into the Saudi sport scene began to develop rapidly. 25 Saudi sport federations established a national women’s team, including a national football and basketball team, as well as the participation of women in tennis, golf, motorsport, boxing, fencing, weightlifting, and pole dancing. In November 2020, the Saudi Arabian Football Federation announced the launch of the first nationwide Saudi women's premier league.

Saudi Arabia, in its vision for modernization, introduced the nation to a number of international sporting events, bringing sports stars to the kingdom. However, in August 2019, the kingdom's strategy received criticism for appearing as a method of sportswashing soon after Saudi's US-based 2018 lobbying campaign foreign registration documentations got published online. The documents showed Saudi Arabia as allegedly implementing a 'sportswashing' strategy, inclusive of meetings and official calls with supreme authorities of associations like the Major League Soccer (MLS), World Wrestling Entertainment (WWE), National Basketball Association (NBA). The strategy is being viewed as a method of sportswashing following the chaos spread across Yemen for 6 years.

TV and media 

Television was introduced in Saudi Arabia in 1954. Saudi Arabia is a major market for pan-Arab satellite and pay-TV. It controls the largest share of the pan-Arab broadcasting market; among the major Saudi-owned broadcasting companies are the Middle East Broadcasting Center, Rotana and the Saudi Broadcasting Authority. The Saudi government closely monitors media and restricts it under official state law. Changes have been made to lessen these restrictions; however, some government-led efforts to control information have also drawn international attention. As of 2022, Reporters Without Borders rates the kingdom's press "Very Serious" situation.

Most of the early newspapers in the Persian Gulf region were established in Saudi Arabia. The first newspaper founded in the country and in the Persian Gulf area is Al Fallah, which was launched in 1920, and the first English-language newspaper is Arab News, which was launched in 1975. All of the newspapers published in Saudi Arabia are privately owned.

Saudi Arabia received access to the Internet in 1994. According to World Bank, as of 2020, 98% of the population of Saudi Arabia are Internet users which puts it in the 8th rank among countries with the highest percentage of internet users. Saudi Arabia has one of the fastest 5G internet speeds in the world. The kingdom is also the 27th largest market for e-commerce with a revenue of US$8 billion in 2021, placing it ahead of Belgium and behind Norway.

See also 

 Index of Saudi Arabia–related articles
 Outline of Saudi Arabia

Notes

References

Bibliography 

 
 

 
 
 
 
 
 
 
  Available at: 
 , especially Chapter 8: Saudi Arabia—Religion, Gender, and the Desire for Democracy. In: The Future of the Gulf Region. Gulf Studies, vol 2. Springer, Cham. The Future of the Gulf Region: Value Change and Global Cycles

External links 

 Saudi Arabia  official government website
 Saudi Arabia. The World Factbook. Central Intelligence Agency.
 
 Saudi Arabia profile from the BBC News
 
 
 Key Development Forecasts for Saudi Arabia from International Futures

 
Arabian Peninsula
Arabic-speaking countries and territories
G20 nations
Kingdoms
Member states of OPEC
Member states of the Arab League
Member states of the Organisation of Islamic Cooperation
Member states of the United Nations
Middle Eastern countries
Near Eastern countries
Western Asian countries
States and territories established in 1932
1932 establishments in Saudi Arabia
Saudi Arabia articles needing attention
Countries in Asia
Member states of the Gulf Cooperation Council
Islamic monarchies